Panique celtique is the debut album recorded by French hip hop act Manau. It was released in July 1998. It achieved success in France and Belgium (Wallonia) where it hit respectively #1 for several weeks and #2. It provided five singles : the two number-one hits "La Tribu de Dana" and "Mais qui est la belette ?", a top nine hit "Panique celtique", and two top 40 hits "L'avenir est un long passé" and "La Confession".

In 1999, the album gained a Victoire de la Musique in the category 'Rap/groove album of the year'.

Track listing
 "Intro" (Martial Tricoche / RV Lardic, Cédric Soubiron) – 1:41
 "La Tribu de Dana" (Martial Tricoche / RV Lardic, Cédric Soubiron, Alan Stivell) – 4:47
 "L'avenir est un long passé" (Martial Tricoche / RV Lardic, Cédric Soubiron) – 4:40
 "Panique celtique" (Martial Tricoche / RV Lardic, Cédric Soubiron) – 3:35
 "Le chant des druides" (Martial Tricoche / RV Lardic, Cédric Soubiron) – 4:17
 "Faut pas tiser en Bretagne" (Martial Tricoche / RV Lardic, Cédric Soubiron) – 3:54
 "Le chien du forgeron" (Martial Tricoche / Grégor Gandon) – 4:23
 "La Confession" (Martial Tricoche / RV Lardic, Cédric Soubiron) – 4:03
 "Un mauvais Dieu" (Martial Tricoche / RV Lardic, Cédric Soubiron) – 4:48
 "Mais qui est la belette ?" (Martial Tricoche / RV Lardic, Cédric Soubiron) – 3:58
 "Je parle" (Martial Tricoche / RV Lardic, Cédric Soubiron) – 4:42

+ Bonus - 1999 issue
 "L'avenir est un long passé" (new version)
 "Mais qui est la belette ?" (remix)

Source : Allmusic

Personnel and credits

 Singers and musicians
 Narrator : Antoine Duléry
 Background vocals : Paul Eric Toussaint, Maro Doucouré, Mario Santangeli and Eric Leroy
 Choir : Elsa Kalfoglou, Pierre Aulas, John Corbett, Iakovos Pappas, Betrand Ricq.
 Accordion : RV Lardic, Didier Ithusarry
 Bass : Guy Delacroix, R.V. Lardic and Laurent Vernerey
 Bombard : Loïc Taillebrest
 Double bass : Laurent Vernerey
 Bagpipes : Loïc Taillebrest
 Guitar : Manu Vergeade and RV Lardic
 Harp : Anne Mispelter
 Keyboards : RV Lardic
 Scratching : Laurent Meliz
 Sequencing : Cédric Soubiron, Grégor Gandon
 Violin : Grégor Gandon, Floriane Bonami
 Alto : Florent Bremont
 Cello : Anne-Gaelle Bisquay and Isabelle Sajot
 Trumpet : Eric Mula

 Recording
 Technical assistance : François Déchery
 Arranged by Manau
 Programming : Laurent Meliz and Grégor Gandon
 Recorded and mixed :
 by Patrice Kung at Studio of La Grande Armée and Studio Plus XXX (tracks 2-5), assistants : Guillaume Mis and Yann Arnaud
 by Bruno Fourrier at the Studio of La Grande Armée (tracks 1, 6-12), assistants : Jérémy Mathot and Bruno Ehlinger (except track 12)
 A & R Production executive Varda Kanon, except track 12 : Kika
 Mastering : Raphaël Jonin-Dyam (tracks 6-11), Mastering Top Master (tracks 2-5), Mastering Translab. Jean-Christophe Beaudon (track 12)
 Editions : BMG Music Publishing France, except track 2 : BMG Publishing France / Warner Chappell Music France

Release history

Certifications

Charts

References

External links
 Review on Manauweb.com

1998 debut albums
Manau (group) albums